Maccoby is a surname. Notable people with the surname include:

 Eleanor Maccoby (1917–2018), American psychologist
 Hyam Maccoby (1924–2004), British scholar and historian
 Michael Maccoby (1933–2022), American psychoanalyst and anthropologist